Hideyo (written:  or ) is a masculine Japanese given name. Notable people with the name include:

, Japanese actor
, Japanese linguist
, Japanese actor
, Japanese politician 
, Japanese bacteriologist
, Japanese golfer

Japanese masculine given names